Andrzej Sieledcow (born 16 July 1946) is a Polish former sports shooter. He competed in two events at the 1972 Summer Olympics.

References

1946 births
Living people
Polish male sport shooters
Olympic shooters of Poland
Shooters at the 1972 Summer Olympics
Sportspeople from Warsaw